Bhiwani Lohar is a village in the Bhiwani district of the Indian state of Haryana. , the village had 641 households with a total population of 4,087 of which 2,505 were male and 1,582 female.

References

Villages in Bhiwani district